The Party of Democratic Action (abbr. SDA) is a Bosniak nationalist, conservative political party in Bosnia and Herzegovina.

History
The Party of Democratic Action (SDA) was founded on 26 May 1990 in Sarajevo, as a "party of Muslim cultural-historic circle". It was a realisation of Alija Izetbegović's idea of an Islamic religious and national party in Bosnia and Herzegovina. Many members of the Islamic Community of Bosnia and Herzegovina, including imams, took part in the party's foundation. Alija, who was chosen as its chairman, tried to resolve disputes between the Muslim nationalist Islamists led by Omer Behmen and the left-wing Muslims led by Adil Zulfikarpašić. The party has its roots in the old Yugoslav Muslim Organization, a conservative Muslim party in the Kingdom of Yugoslavia. Yugoslav Muslim Organization was a successor of Muslimanska Narodna Organizacija (Muslim National Organization), a conservative Muslim party founded in 1906 during the Austro-Hungarian era. The Muslim National Organization was itself a successor of the conservative Muslim "Movement for waqf and educational autonomy" (Pokret za vakufsko-mearifsku autonomiju) that goes back to 1887.

The SDA achieved considerable success in elections after the breakup of Yugoslavia in the early 1990s. It founded the newspaper Ljiljan. The party remains the strongest political party among the Bosniak population in Bosnia and Herzegovina.

In November 2000 the party was defeated by the Social Democratic Party and other parties gathered into the "Alliance for Change", and found itself in opposition for the first time since its creation. After the 2022 general election, the SDA became once again the largest party in Bosnia and Herzegovina.

The party has branches in Slovenia, Kosovo, North Macedonia, Croatia and the Sandžak region of Serbia. One of the goals of the party, outside Bosnia and Herzegovina, is to represent and defend the interests of Bosniaks and other Muslim South Slavs in the entire Balkan region. In Montenegro, the SDA merged with smaller Bosniak and Slavic Muslim parties to create the Bosniak Party.

The party is an observer member of the European People's Party (EPP).

Ideology
The Party of Democratic Action is the primary stronghold for right-orientated Bosniaks, especially for nationalists, and conservatives, and thus they have been described as national-conservative. Besides that, the party has been also described as Islamist and Pan-Islamist, and its leadership has been described by some, to have close ties with the Muslim Brotherhood, and with current Islamist regimes such as Turkey and Iran. Some have even described them as secularist. They support the centralization of the government of Bosnia and Herzegovina. On foreign stances they also tend to be atlanticist and supportive of the accession of Bosnia and Herzegovina to NATO and the European Union.

List of presidents

Elections

Parliamentary elections

Presidency elections

Cantonal election results

Notes
In the 1998 elections, the SDA was the main party in the Coalition for Unity and Democracy, along with the Party for Bosnia and Herzegovina, Liberal Democratic Party and Civic Democratic Party.

References

Notes

Books

Other sources

External links
 

 
Political parties established in 1990
Islamic political parties